Cecil Robert Bull (October 25, 1890 – June 15, 1978) was a Canadian politician. He served in the Legislative Assembly of British Columbia from 1937 to 1941  from the electoral district of South Okanagan, a member of the Liberal party.

References

1890 births
1978 deaths